Standard Design for Buddhist Temple Construction is a Chinese language text written by Daoxuan in the early Tang Dynasty. It described a design for Buddhist temples influenced by mainstream Chinese architecture, and based upon a traditional layout composed of multiple, related courtyards.  This architectural tradition can be traced back to the Shang and Zhou Dynasties.

Architecture in China
Buddhist temples in China